The 2017 U.S. Open Grand Prix Gold, is the eleventh Grand Prix's badminton tournament of the 2017 BWF Grand Prix Gold and Grand Prix and the 55th edition of the U.S. Open tournament. The tournament was held at the Anaheim Convention Center in Anaheim, California, United States on 19 – 23 July 2017 and had a total purse of $120,000.

Men's singles

Seeds

 Lee Hyun-il (first round)
 H. S. Prannoy (champion)
 Brice Leverdez (second round)
 Kazumasa Sakai (first round)
 Sameer Verma (quarterfinals)
 Zulfadli Zulkiffli (second round)
 Pablo Abián (third round)
 Kanta Tsuneyama (quarterfinals)
 Ygor Coelho (third round)
 Jeon Hyeok-jin (quarterfinals)
 Henri Hurskainen (withdrew)
 Mark Caljouw (third round)
 Lucas Corvee (second round)
 Lucas Claerbout (second round)
 Nguyen Tien Minh (semifinals)
 Niluka Karunaratne (third round)

Finals

Top half

Section 1

Section 2

Section 3

Section 4

Bottom half

Section 5

Section 6

Section 7

Section 8

Women's singles

Seeds

 Beiwen Zhang (quarterfinals)
 Saina Nehwal (withdrew)
 Aya Ohori (champion)
 Linda Zetchiri (second round)
 Lee Jang-mi (semifinals)
 Michelle Li (final)
 Natalia Koch Rohde (quarterfinals)
 Vu Thi Trang (first round)

Finals

Top half

Section 1

Section 2

Bottom half

Section 3

Section 4

Men's doubles

Seeds

 Lu Ching-yao / Yang Po-han (final)
 Takuto Inoue / Yuki Kaneko (champion)
 Manu Attri / B. Sumeeth Reddy (semifinals)
 Satwiksairaj Rankireddy / Chirag Shetty (first round)
 Matthew Chau / Sawan Serasinghe (first round)
 Richard Eidestedt / Nico Ruponen (first round)
 Hiroki Okamura / Masayuki Onodera (quarterfinals)
 Joshua Magee / Sam Magee (first round)

Finals

Top half

Section 1

Section 2

Bottom half

Section 3

Section 4

Women's doubles

Seeds

 Gabriela Stoeva / Stefani Stoeva (second round)
 Setyana Mapasa / Gronya Somerville (withdrew)
 Anastasia Chervyakova / Olga Morozova (second round)
 Kim Hye-rin / Yoo Hae-won (quarterfinals)
 Chae Yoo-jung / Kim So-yeong (semifinals)
 Eefje Muskens / Selena Piek (withdrew)
 Mayu Matsumoto / Wakana Nagahara (final)
 Lauren Smith / Sarah Walker (second round)

Finals

Top half

Section 1

Section 2

Bottom half

Section 3

Section 4

Mixed doubles

Seeds

 Tan Kian Meng / Lai Pei Jing (quarterfinals)
 Choi Sol-gyu / Chae Yoo-jung (quarterfinals)
 Pranaav Jerry Chopra / N. Sikki Reddy (first round)
 Goh Soon Huat / Shevon Jemie Lai (quarterfinals)
 Sam Magee / Chloe Magee (first round)
 Nico Ruponen / Amanda Hogstrom (second round)
 Jacco Arends / Selena Piek (first round)
 Ronan Labar / Audrey Fontaine (quarterfinals)

Finals

Top half

Section 1

Section 2

Bottom half

Section 3

Section 4

References

External links
 Tournament Link

U.S. Open Badminton Championships
U.S. Open Grand Prix Gold
BWF Grand Prix Gold and Grand Prix
2017 in American sports
U.S. Open Grand Prix Gold